Robert Raeside (born 7 July 1972 in South Africa) is a former Scottish footballer who is the manager of St Andrews United.

Raeside began his career with Raith Rovers, winning two Scottish First Division titles and the Scottish League Cup during his six years at Starks Park. In 1996, Raeside moved to Dundee, where he won another First Division title in 1998. In 2000, Raeside joined Arbroath after a loan spell and went on to play for a number of other clubs, such as Greenock Morton, Alloa Athletic, Stirling Albion and Peterhead, before returning to Arbroath in 2006.

Out of contract at Arbroath he accepted a months loan at Shelbourne in July 2000. He played one game in the UEFA Champions League qualifier win in Macedonia against Sloga Jugomagnat before returning to Scotland.

Honours

Raith Rovers
Scottish Football League First Division: 2
 1992-93, 1994-95
Scottish League Cup: 1
 1994-95

Dundee
Scottish Football League First Division: 1
 1997-98

External links
Fitzpatrick, Seán Shelbourne Cult Heroes (2009, Colour Books) 

1972 births
Living people
Scottish footballers
Scottish people of South African descent
Raith Rovers F.C. players
Dundee F.C. players
Arbroath F.C. players
Greenock Morton F.C. players
Alloa Athletic F.C. players
Stirling Albion F.C. players
Peterhead F.C. players
Scottish Football League players
Scottish Premier League players
Association football defenders
Shelbourne F.C. players
League of Ireland players
People from Polokwane
South African emigrants to the United Kingdom
St Andrews United F.C. players
Sportspeople from Limpopo